Victor Joseph Roznovsky  (October 19, 1938 – January 18, 2022) was an American professional baseball catcher, who played in Major League Baseball (MLB) for the Chicago Cubs, Baltimore Orioles, and Philadelphia Phillies, from 1964 to 1969. He batted left-handed and threw right-handed.

The most big league action Roznovsky saw in any one season, was with the 1965 Cubs, appearing in 71 games, with 193 plate appearances. He was acquired by the Orioles from the Cubs for Carl Warwick on March 31, 1966. He was on the Orioles' roster for the 1966 World Series but did not appear in any games. Roznovsky was traded to the Phillies, April 12, 1969, and ended his career there.

Roznovsky died in Fresno, California, on January 18, 2022, at the age of 83.

References

External links

 Vic Roznovsky at SABR (Baseball BioProject)

1938 births
2022 deaths
Baseball players from Texas
Major League Baseball catchers
Chicago Cubs players
Baltimore Orioles players
Philadelphia Phillies players
Tacoma Cubs players
Springfield Giants players
Quincy Giants players
Rochester Red Wings players
Buffalo Bisons (minor league) players
Salt Lake City Bees players
El Paso Sun Kings players
Fresno Giants players
People from Shiner, Texas
Roswell Pirates players